Caroline Baur (born 17 April 1994) is a Swiss professional racing cyclist, who currently rides for UCI Women's Continental Team .

See also
 List of 2015 UCI Women's Teams and riders

References

External links

1994 births
Living people
Swiss female cyclists
Place of birth missing (living people)
20th-century Swiss women
21st-century Swiss women